Peaker may refer to:  

 Peaking power plant
 Brian Peaker, Canadian rower
 Charles Peaker (1899–1978), Canadian organist
 E. J. Peaker, American actress
 14595 Peaker, a main-belt asteroid